Susan Paige Semrau (born March 9, 1962) is the former head women's basketball coach at Florida State University. From 1997 through 2022, Semrau compiled a 468-252 career record at FSU. She retired after her 24th season at FSU. During the 2020–21 season she took a leave of absence to care for her mother.  She guided the Seminoles to appearances in the NCAA tournament 15 total times, including 14 out of the past 15 seasons including three Elite Eights. Until her final season, Semrau at FSU never lost a 1st Round NCAA tournament game, going 15-0. In the 2019–20 season, she hit the 200 ACC wins milestone as a head coach.

Prior to being at Florida State, she was the head coach of Division III's Occidental College for four seasons before spending six seasons as an assistant coach at Northern Illinois University (1991–92 and 1993–94) and the University of Wisconsin (1994–95 and 1996–97).

Semrau grew up in the state of Washington, and attended Shorecrest High School in Seattle. At first, she stayed in Washington for college, playing for Puget Sound for two years before transferring to UC-San Diego for her final two seasons.

Career milestones
 All-time winningest coach at Florida State University 
 200 career wins (and counting) in the Atlantic Coast Conference (ACC)
 Defeated Clemson at Clemson for the first time in school history
 Eight straight wins over the Clemson Tigers (school record)
 Defeated Virginia for the first time in school history
 3-time Atlantic Coast Conference Coach of the Year
 2-time co-champions of the ACC
 First Sweet 16 appearance in 2006–2007 season
 Named United States Marine Corps/WBCA Division I National Coach of the Year
2013—Kay Yow Heart Coach of the Year
 2015—Associated Press College Basketball Coach of the Year

Coaching record

* 16 wins in 2006–07 and 6 wins in 2007–08 vacated by NCAA

References

External links
 Florida State profile

1962 births
Living people
American women's basketball coaches
Basketball coaches from Washington (state)
Basketball players from Seattle
Florida State Seminoles women's basketball coaches
Northern Illinois Huskies women's basketball coaches
Place of birth missing (living people)
Puget Sound Loggers women's basketball players
UC San Diego Tritons women's basketball players
Wisconsin Badgers women's basketball coaches